Altiostar is a company that provides open virtual radio access network (vRAN) technology. The company is headquartered just outside of Boston, Massachusetts, with offices in Japan, Italy, the U.K., Mexico and India. The company is a subsidiary of Rakuten. Founded in 2011 by President and CEO, Ashraf Dahod, Altiostar is focused on open, virtual RAN software that they claim can integrate operation of equipment from multiple vendors.

History

Altiostar was started by the founders of Starent Networks, a startup bought by Cisco in 2009.  Altiostar came out of stealth mode in late 2014 after raising $70 million in funding starting in 2012.  The company's initial offering was a virtualized Cloud-RAN (C-RAN) solution that connected radios with controllers with Ethernet, instead of dark fiber. In 2015, the company introduced a virtual radio access network (vRAN) product. In 2017, Altiostar released an Open vRAN Development Platform, allowing independent radio equipment manufacturers to develop a vRAN solution utilizing Altiostar technology. Since its debut, the company has raised $357.5 million from Cisco, Rakuten Mobile, Qualcomm Ventures, Telefonica and Tech Mahindra among others.

Rakuten

In 2019, Rakuten Mobile invested in Altiostar. In 2020, Rakuten commercially launched its 4G network in Japan, using Altiostar as a software contributor for its 4G RAN, with plans to also use the software for its 5G network. In August 2021, Rakuten acquired Altiostar.

Partners

Altiostar has collaborated with a wide variety of partners to enable 4G and 5G network transformation through its open vRAN solution, including:

2011 – Cisco

2015 – Texas Instruments, Qwilt  and Wind River

2016 – TIM

2017 – Corning and Dali Wireless and SK Telecom

2018 – Amdocs, Deutsche Telekom, GCI, Sercomm, Telefónica and Vodafone

2019 – Qualcomm, Rakuten, Telecom Infra Project (TIP)  and Ubicquia

2020 – Airspan, Bharti Airtel, NEC Corporation (NEC) and World Wide Technology

Awards

2015 – Fierce Innovation Awards (Telecom Edition) - Next-Gen Deployment for NFV C-RAN Solution

2016 – GLOTEL Global Telecoms Awards “Highly Recommended” for Innovative Use of Spectrum

2017 – GSMA GLOMO Award - Best Mobile Technology Breakthrough and Outstanding Overall Mobile Technology – The CTO's choice for vRAN Solution

2019 – GSMA 100

2019 – Intel Network Builders Winners’ Circle 2019-2020 Leaders Board

References

External links

Companies based in Massachusetts
2011 establishments in Massachusetts